Henry Mavrodin (31 July 1937 – 18 May 2022) was a Romanian painter, designer, essayist, and university teacher. 
He was born in Bucharest, Romania, on 31 July 1937, and died on 18 May 2022, at the age of 84.

Formation
1953–1957 Secondary School of Fine Arts – Bucharest, Romania 
1957–1963 attends the courses of the Bucharest National University of Arts, in the class of master Corneliu Baba

University activity
1991–2001 Professor at the Bucharest National University of Arts (gave courses on drawing and painting).
1996–2001 Dean of the Faculty of Theory and History of Art at the University of Fine Arts in Bucharest.
2001–2006 Professor at National University of Theatre and Film in Bucharest
1996–1999 PhD in the aesthetics of visual arts with the Glaucon thesis or the prestige of the artist in the Ideal City

Personal exhibitions
1971 Galleria Internazionale d'arte La chiocciola/La chiocciola  International Art Gallery Padova, Italy. 
1972 Galleria d'arte Viotti, Turin, Italy /Viotti Art Gallery, Turin, Italy. 
1975 Retrospective at the University Cultural Center, Pordenone, Italy. 
1989 20 years of painting in Italy, Castle in Bazzano, Bazzano city under the patronage of City, Civic and Archaeological Museum, Bazzano, Italy.
1998 National Museum of Arts of Romania, Bucharest. 
1998 Mavrodin and his students, Catacomb Gallery, Bucharest.
1999 Morandi Museum, Bologna, Italy. 
2005 Exhibition of Henry Mavrodin donation to Moderna Museet, Stockholm, Sweden

Group exhibitions
1963 Corneliu Baba class promotion exhibition, Dalles Hall, Bucharest.  
1967 Commemorative exhibition The International Colloquium C. Brancusi, Bucharest, Romania.
1966 Group exhibition at Casa Scriitorilor of Bucharest
1969 1st International Exhibition of Painting at CagnessurMer, France (prize for Romanian artists).		
1970 Apollo Gallery, Bucharest. 
1970 the 35th International Biennale of Arts in Venice, Italy.	
1974 Represented Italy at the 1st International Exhibition of Glass, Brussels, Belgium.	 
1977 20th International Quadrennial Exhibition, Rome, Italy.	
1996 Commemorative group exhibition entitled 100 Year Anniversary of the Birth of Tristan Tzara, Bucharest, Dalles exhibition hall.	
1996 Romanian Arts of the '90s. UnaBisanzio Latina Galleria Bramante, Rome, Italy.	
1998 Bucarest 2000 Budapest, an exhibition of Romanian contemporary art in Budapest, Hungary.	  
1999 Relationship and heritage exhibition, organized by the Ministry of Culture in Romania and the European Council Kalinderu Hall, Bucharest, Romania.	
2002 Opere del 900, The Luigi Spazzapan Gallery of Contemporary Art, Gradiscad'Isonzo, Gorizia, Italy.		 
2009 Exhibition Ciubotaru & Mavrodin - object (room Theodor Pallady, Romanian Academy) and the Tower of Babel donation monumental work, the Romanian Academy, financed by Fildas Art

Awards and orders
1967 The 3rd National Prize for Painting (The Union of Professional Artists in Bucharest, Romania).
1968 First Prize, the Golden Medal, at the 1968 International Book Fair, Bucharest, Romania.	
1968 The 3rd National Prize for Painting (The Union of Professional Artists in Bucharest, Romania).
1969 International Festival of Painting Prize Cagnes sur Mer in France (Romanian Pavilion Award).
2005 Order of the Star of Italian Solidarity with the rank of Commander, awarded by the President of Italy
2015 Grand Prize from the Romanian Fine Artists’ Union (Bucharest, Romania)

Works in museums
 Museum of Contemporary Art, Moderna Museet in Stockholm, Sweden

About art of Henry Mavrodin
With its elevation of spirit, depth of feeling and erudite pictoriality, this exhibition is a rare occurrence over the course of a century. I am not normally prone to bursts of enthusiasm. Awestruck by the evidence, however, I recognise the magnificence of an art that is strange, troubling, provocative in respect of time and surroundings, the idea of perfection unusual in a world that cultivates the ephemeral, superficiality, imposture and financial success. (N.b. Henry Mavrodin does not sell his art insofar as it is experienced as an intimate dialogue with destiny or God, whoever he might be.) Knowing the morality of artists, I know that he will be hated for his limited, shining, long-lasting glory. For a great artist, I was once told by the eminent art historian Eugenio Riccomini, who dedicated a monograph in Italy to our painter and was kind enough to open the exhibition in Bucharest, enemies are important. Henry Mavrodin is a bizarre alloy of pride and humility: natural pride in the creative professions (only public servants and others of their kind have a claim on mediocrity), and equally natural humility towards the great landmarks in the history of art, which he fatally dreams of achieving and equalling. He shows a sacred respect for the great European painting of centuries past and sees himself as a happy prisoner of its emotional space, most likely for a number of fundamental reasons: spiritual harmony, the need for meaning, the urgent need for philosophical inquiry, the possibility of probing the sublime complexities of technique. Those who reject improvisation, rapid and cheap recognition, seem to have no other path to choose. (...)
We contemplate calmly a picture which demands our attention insatiably, melancholically, imploringly, aggressively, like mute suffering condemned to silence and strictly visual confession. The colours appear to have been invented by providence, they submit to reason and intuition alike in proportions that are implacable and, therefore, perfect. The objects have a secret life. The faces at times take on the appearance of masks; the landscapes, the compositions wrestle with their volumetric reality, inevitably crucified in bidimensionality. Their refined ambiguity attempts to combine in pure visuality material consistency and its ghost, the mental reading of an image in perspective and the concreteness of the geometrical plane of the canvas surface.
Henry Mavrodin is a soul trapped between two worlds. One of his works can take a year to complete, as recorded scrupulously at the bottom of the work like a tally. The fast-paced world of today has thrown him out and into the heart of eternal art. His admirers will be rare but of a high quality. He is the final firework display in the amazing adventure of painting which began centuries ago, says professor Eugenio Riccomini. His room for manoeuvre appears to be limited. It is not. Between the memory of great past values and the contemporary world, which is incapable of establishing its own values, our painter, so extravagant with time, stubbornly and miserly saves up death in life, and installs himself comfortably as occupying an uninhabited plot of land. He fills empty space and treats wounds that continue to bleed under the surface, following in his master's footsteps, whose unusual portrait he worked on for seven years, and from which he learned that art does not march with the regiment, but consumes itself in sweet and sour solitude. Radu Cornel Constantinescu

Mavrodin is an exceptional vis-a vis the distinctive characteristics of contemporary Romanian painting, being an example of independence from the current trends, or to be more precise, the latest fashions in art today. He is a painter that loves solitude and calm, and to find these he took refuge in a corner of the island of Murano, that is in a place particularly favourable to viewing and reviewing the inner side of the pictures of his own dreams. For the paintings of Mavrodin are composed of dreams from outside time, reconstructed in the space of the painting, with the technical authority worthy of an old Fleming (...)
Among the multiple aspects of the multiple revival of figurative realism, the magical evocations of Mavrodin's painting deserve to be considered in a light of their own for their solitude and the quality of the authentic poetic vocation. Giuseppe Marchiori

Notes

Bibliography
 Eugenio Riccòmini, Henry Mavrodin Catalogo, Rocca dei Bentivoglio, Bazzano, 1989/ Exposition Catalog The Bentivoglio Castel, Bazzano, Italy, 1989
 The old law of Lavoisier, Italian-Romanian bilingual edition, Aspasia FM Editore, Bologna, Italy/Vechea lege a lui Lavoisier, ediţie bilingvă italiană-română, Aspasia F.M. Editore, Bologna, Italy, 1992 
Essay on drawing, F.M. Editore, Bologna, Italy, 1996/Saggio sul disegno, F.M. Editore, Bologna, Italy, 1996. 
1998 Mavrodin, albumul expoziţiei de la Muzeul Naţional de Artă al României, Aspasia, Bologna, Italy. 
1999 Mavrodin, albumul expoziţiei de la Muzeul Morandi din Bologna, Aspasia, Bologna, Italy. 
1999 Platon şi creştinismul, "Revista de filosofie", Editura Academiei Române, 1999. 
2000 Glaocon sau prestigiul artistului în Cetatea Ideală, Editura Paidea, București, Romania. 
2002 Laudatio, în volumul colectiv, Omagiu Dan Grigorescu la 70 de ani, Ex Ponto, Constanţa, 2002, pp. 17-18. 
2007 Album Henry Mavrodin, Editura Institutului Cultural Roman, coordinator Ileana Stănculescu; 
2009 Gemenele vitrege. Eseuri, comunicări, interviuri, evocări, scrisori, Editura Paideia, București, 208 pag. 
2009 Catalogul expoziţiei Ciubotaru & Mavrodin Masterprint, 66 pag (sala Theodor Pallady, Biblioteca Academiei Române), sub patronajul Academiei Române, Fildas Art. 
2008 Ateliere de artişti din București, Ed. Noimediaprint, Henry Mavrodin- pp. 82–87, coordinator Mihai Oroveanu; 
2003 Dan Grigorescu, Dicţionarul avangardelor, Henry Mavrodin pp. 425-426, Editura Enciclopedică;

External links
 The official website of the artist http://henrymavrodin.ro/ 
 Search Henry Mavrodin https://web.archive.org/web/20140416040834/http://www.modernamuseet.se/en/The-Collection/The-collection1/Search-the-Collection/

1937 births
2022 deaths
Artists from Bucharest
Romanian painters
Romanian essayists